The Eastern Province Society of Engineers (EPSE) was an association for Professional Engineers and Engineering Associates in the Eastern Province region of South Africa. It was founded in Port Elizabeth in 1926.

1926 was also the year when General Motors established a factory in Darling Street, Port Elizabeth. The engineering profession was growing fast in the region.

Its aims was to promote the art of engineering and continuous professional development in the engineering profession for the Eastern Province region. The Society was affiliated to the Engineering Council of South Africa, the statutory body for Professional Engineers in South Africa.

The Society was wound up in the year 2001 when no ordinary members wanted to be nominated as new committee members. All documents and artefacts were handed over to the Port Elizabeth Museum.

External links and references
ecsa.co.za

Engineering societies based in South Africa